Xander Jan Bogaerts (born October 1, 1992), nicknamed "the X-Man" and "Bogey" or "Bogie", is an Aruban professional baseball shortstop for the San Diego Padres of Major League Baseball (MLB). He has previously played in MLB for the Boston Red Sox. He has also been a member of the Netherlands national baseball team.

After being signed as an amateur free agent by the Red Sox in 2009, Bogaerts made his MLB debut in 2013, appearing in 30 games between the regular season and postseason, and helping the Red Sox to the World Series championship. He became the Red Sox' starting shortstop in 2014, and was awarded the American League's Silver Slugger Award at the position in back-to-back years, 2015 and 2016, and again in 2019 and 2021. He has the most games played at the position of shortstop for the Red Sox, having set the record in 2022.

Professional career

Minor leagues
Mike Lord, a scout for the Boston Red Sox, discovered Bogaerts at the age of 16, in 2009. After not playing baseball for two weeks due to the chicken pox, Bogaerts played for Lord, who recommended him to Craig Shipley, the Red Sox' vice president of international scouting. Shipley flew to Aruba to watch Bogaerts play. The Red Sox signed him to a contract with a $410,000 signing bonus.

Bogaerts made his professional debut in 2010 in the Dominican Summer League (DSL), where he had a .314 batting average, .396 on-base percentage, and .423 slugging percentage. He led the DSL Red Sox in each of those categories, along with hits (75), home runs (3), RBIs (42), and total bases (101). He was fifth in the DSL in RBIs and tenth in total bases, and he had a .929 fielding percentage. The next year, at age 18, Bogaerts played for the Greenville Drive of the Class A South Atlantic League, where he had a slash line of .260/.324/.509, fielded .924, and hit 16 home runs in 72 games.

During the 2012 season, Bogaerts started out in Class A and ended up playing with the Portland Sea Dogs of the Class AA Eastern League. He was named to appear in the 2012 All-Star Futures Game. Heading into the 2013 season, Bogaerts ranked sixth in the MLB.com Top 100 Prospects list, eighth in the Baseball America Top 100 Prospects list, and was ranked the fifth-best prospect by ESPN's Keith Law, who described him as "Still just 20 years old, Bogaerts has been playing solid shortstop for Portland with a solid walk rate but isn't yet generating the power expected from his explosive swing."

Boston Red Sox

2013–2015

Bogaerts started the season with Portland and was promoted to the Pawtucket Red Sox of the Triple-A International League in mid-June. The Red Sox promoted Bogaerts to the major leagues on August 19. Bogaerts made his MLB debut on August 20 against the San Francisco Giants. He got his first major league hit five days later against the Los Angeles Dodgers. On September 7, Bogaerts hit his first MLB home run against New York Yankees pitcher Jim Miller. At the end of the 2013 Minor League season, Bogaerts gained USA Today Minor League Player of the Year honors and was  named to the Baseball America Minor League All-Star Team. During his brief stint in the majors in 2013, Bogaerts appeared in 18 games batting .250 with a home run, five RBIs, and a stolen base.

Despite debuting late in the season, Bogaerts was part of the 25-man active roster during the postseason run. Bogaerts had a strong performance in the postseason as he batted .296 with two RBIs in 12 postseason games, eventually leading to the Red Sox winning their eighth World Series in franchise history. Bogaerts also became the youngest player to hit a triple in World Series history.

Bogaerts began the 2014 season as the starting shortstop for Boston. On May 29, Bogaerts had his first walk-off plate appearance on a throwing error by Atlanta Braves third baseman Chris Johnson, allowing Red Sox outfielder Jackie Bradley Jr. to score. On June 2, the Red Sox re-signed Stephen Drew and Bogaerts was moved back to third base. Bogaerts returned to shortstop once again when the Red Sox sent Drew to the rival New York Yankees at the trading deadline on July 31. For the season, Bogaerts played 99 games at shortstop and 44 games at third base, while batting .240 with 12 home runs and 46 RBIs.

In 2015, Bogaerts led the Red Sox with a career-high .320 average (along with seven home runs and 81 RBIs), finishing second only to Miguel Cabrera for the American League batting title. From late July, Bogaerts began to bat second or third exclusively. He had 10 hits with the bases loaded, the most in MLB for 2015. He received the American League's Silver Slugger Award for shortstop. On top of his breakout offense, Bogaerts was also a finalist for the Rawlings Gold Glove Award at shortstop.

2016–2019

In 2016, Bogaerts again began the season as the Red Sox' starting shortstop, primarily batting third. Between May 6 and June 2, Bogaerts hit safely in 26 consecutive games. His hitting streak came to an end in a loss to the Toronto Blue Jays on June 3. He was chosen to play in the 2016 MLB All-Star Game, the first of his career; he started at shortstop and was 1-for-2 at the plate. Bogaerts finished the season batting .294 with 21 home runs and 89 RBIs, and was once again given the American League's shortstop Silver Slugger Award.

Bogaerts became eligible for salary arbitration in 2017. He and the Red Sox avoided an arbitration hearing by agreeing to a $4.5 million salary for the 2017 season. In 2017, Bogaerts usually hit in the sixth spot in the batting order. On July 6, he was hit on the right wrist by a pitch from Jacob Faria of the Tampa Bay Rays. It was later diagnosed as a sprained joint. Despite this, Bogaerts declined being placed on the disabled list, and played while injured for the rest of the season. He later admitted this was a mistake, stating that he went through a two-month stretch in which he could not swing comfortably. As a result, he finished the season batting .273 with just 10 home runs and 62 RBIs.

Bogaerts and the Red Sox agreed to a $7.05 million salary for the 2018 season. He began the 2018 season usually batting fifth in the lineup. He hit two grand slams in April; one on April 7 against the Tampa Bay Rays, and one on April 30 against the Kansas City Royals. Bogaerts was named AL Player of the Week for the week of July 2–8. He hit another grand slam on July 14, this one an extra-innings walk-off home run against the Toronto Blue Jays. For the regular season, Bogaerts had 23 home runs, 103 RBIs, and a .288 average. The Red Sox finished the year 108–54 and won the World Series over the Los Angeles Dodgers. Bogaerts was the only player to be on the Red Sox roster for both the 2013 and 2018 World Series.

The Red Sox and Bogaerts came to terms on a $12 million salary for the 2019 season in January. On April 1, 2019, the Red Sox announced that they signed Bogaerts to a six-year contract extension worth $132 million. On July 3, MLB announced that Bogaerts had been selected for the 2019 All-Star Game. On September 7, Bogaerts registered his 1,000th MLB career hit, in a game against the New York Yankees. Bogaerts finished the 2019 season with a .309 average, 52 doubles, 33 home runs and 117 RBIs (second in the American League). He finished fifth in 2019 AL MVP voting and won his third Silver Slugger Award.

2020–2022
During the shortened 2020 season, Bogaerts was again Boston's primary shortstop. On August 2 against the Yankees, he had four hits with two homers and three RBIs. Bogaerts had two multi-steal games—on September 12 against the Rays and on September 18 against the Yankees. He finished the season with a 10 game hitting streak and 18 straight games getting on base. Overall with the 2020 Red Sox, he batted .300 with 11 home runs, 28 RBIs and 8 stolen bases in 56 games. Bogaerts led all AL shortstops in home runs and RBIs, and was second in runs, total bases, on base percentage, slugging and OPS.

Bogaerts returned as Boston's primary shortstop in 2021. On July 1, he was named the AL starting shortstop for the 2021 All-Star Game. On August 31, Bogaerts was removed from a game in Tampa Bay due to a positive COVID-19 test. He returned to the lineup on September 10. Bogaerts played in a total of 144 games during the regular season for Boston, batting .295 with 23 home runs and 79 RBIs. He also appeared in 11 postseason games, batting 12-for-46 (.261) as the Red Sox advanced to the American League Championship Series. On November 11, Bogaerts was announced as the AL recipient of the Silver Slugger Award for shortstops, his fourth time winning the award.

In 2022, Bogaerts again served as the primary shortstop for the Red Sox. On July 10, he was named to the AL roster for the 2022 All-Star Game as a reserve selection. On September 6, he was named AL Player of the Week after batting 15-for-31 in seven games. For the season, Bogaerts batted .307 with 15 home runs and 73 RBIs in 150 games. He was again nominated for a Gold Glove Award, the All-MLB Team, and won a Silver Slugger Award, his fifth.

On November 7, 2022, Bogaerts opted out of his Red Sox contract and became a free agent.

San Diego Padres
On December 9, 2022, Bogaerts signed an 11-year, $280 million contract with the San Diego Padres.

International career
As a citizen of Aruba, a constituent country of the Netherlands, Bogaerts has played for the Dutch national baseball team in the 2011 Baseball World Cup (which the team won), the 2013 World Baseball Classic, and the 2017 World Baseball Classic. In the 2017 edition of the tournament, Bogaerts slashed .227/.419/.318, with five hits in 22 at-bats. He led the Dutch national team in walks, with seven.

Bogaerts returned to represent the Dutch team at the 2023 World Baseball Classic. He slashed .267/.353/.533 in 15 at-bats over four games of pool play. However, Pool A ended in a five-way tie, with all five teams finishing with 2-2 records, and the Netherlands was eliminated by tiebreaker.

Personal life
Xander has a twin brother named Jair who also signed with the Red Sox as an international free agent. He was sent to the Chicago Cubs prior to the 2012 season to complete the compensation regarding Theo Epstein.

Xander Bogaerts is the fifth Aruban to play in MLB, following Sidney Ponson, Calvin Maduro, Gene Kingsale, and Radhames Dykhoff. In 2011, after winning the gold medal in the Baseball World Cup, Bogaerts was inducted into the Knights Order of Orange-Nassau by the Governor of Aruba. Bogaerts speaks four languages: English, Spanish, Dutch, and Papiamento, the latter two being Aruba's official languages. On February 10, 2021, the Commandeur Pieter Boer School in San Nicolas, Aruba, changed its name and became Scol Basico Xander Bogaerts.

References

External links

, or Retrosheet
 

1992 births
2013 World Baseball Classic players
2017 World Baseball Classic players
2023 World Baseball Classic players
American League All-Stars
Aruban expatriate baseball players in the United States
Boston Red Sox players
Dominican Summer League Red Sox players
Greenville Drive players
Knights of the Order of Orange-Nassau
Living people
Major League Baseball players from Aruba
Pawtucket Red Sox players
People from San Nicolaas
Portland Sea Dogs players
Salem Red Sox players
Silver Slugger Award winners
Aruban expatriate baseball players in the Dominican Republic
Aruban people of African descent